Ivan is an unincorporated community in Wirt County, West Virginia, United States.

The community was named after Ivan Owens, the son of an early postmaster.

References 

Unincorporated communities in West Virginia
Unincorporated communities in Wirt County, West Virginia